Elsa Guðrún Jónsdóttir (born 29 March 1986) is an Icelandic cross-country skier. She competed in the women's 10 kilometre freestyle at the 2018 Winter Olympics.

References

External links
 

1986 births
Living people
Icelandic female cross-country skiers
Olympic cross-country skiers of Iceland
Cross-country skiers at the 2018 Winter Olympics
Place of birth missing (living people)
21st-century Icelandic women